Evesham was a parliamentary constituency in Worcestershire which was represented in the British House of Commons. Originally a parliamentary borough consisting of the town of Evesham, it was first represented in 1295. After this its franchise lapsed for several centuries, but it then returned two Members of Parliament (MPs) from 1604 until 1868, when its representation was reduced to one member under the Representation of the People Act 1867.

From the 1885 general election, Evesham was abolished as a borough but the name was transferred to a larger county constituency electing one MP. This constituency was abolished for the 1950 general election, with the town of Evesham itself being transferred to the new seat of South Worcestershire. Between 1885 and 1918 the constituency had the full name of the Southern, or Evesham, Division of Worcestershire (not to be confused with the 1950 seat).

Boundaries 
 1604–1885: The parishes of All Saints, Evesham, St Lawrence, Evesham and Bengeworth
 1885–1918: The petty sessional divisions of Blockley, Evesham, Pershore and Upton-on-Severn, and parts of the petty sessional divisions of Malvern and Redditch
 1918–1950: The municipal boroughs of Droitwich and Evesham, the rural districts of Droitwich, Evesham, Feckenham, Pershore and Shipston-on-Stour, the parishes of Bredon, Bredon's Norton, Conderton, Overbury and Teddington from the rural district of Tewkesbury and the parts of the rural districts of Stow on the Wold and Winchcombe within the administrative county of Worcestershire

Members of Parliament

1604-1640

1640-1868

1868-1950

Elections

Elections in the 1830s

 

The 1830 election was declared void on 13 December 1830, but no new writ was issued before dissolution ahead of the 1831 election.

 

 

 

Cockerell's death caused a by-election.

 

 

On petition, Borthwick was unseated and Hill declared elected instead.

Elections in the 1840s

 

Hill was appointed Comptroller of the Household, requiring a by-election.

Elections in the 1850s

 

Berkeley resigned to contest the 1855 by-election in Cheltenham, causing a by-election.

Elections in the 1860s
Willoughby's death caused a by-election.

 

Seat reduced to one member

Elections in the 1870s

Elections in the 1880s 

The 1880 election was declared void on account of bribery of electors, causing a by-election.

Lehmann's election was declared void, on account of bribery and corruption, and Hartland was then elected after scrutiny.

Elections in the 1890s

Elections in the 1900s

Elections in the 1910s 

General Election 1914–15:

Another General Election was required to take place before the end of 1915. The political parties had been making preparations for an election to take place and by the July 1914, the following candidates had been selected; 
Unionist: Bolton Eyres-Monsell
Liberal: William Pearce Ellis

Elections in the 1920s

Elections in the 1930s 

withdrew 

General Election 1939–40:

Another General Election was required to take place before the end of 1940. The political parties had been making preparations for an election to take place and by the Autumn of 1939, the following candidates had been selected; 
Conservative: Rupert de la Bere
Liberal: W F Newnes 
British Union: John Dowty

Elections in the 1940s

References

 Robert Beatson, A Chronological Register of Both Houses of Parliament (London: Longman, Hurst, Res & Orme, 1807) 
D Brunton & D H Pennington, Members of the Long Parliament (London: George Allen & Unwin, 1954)
Cobbett's Parliamentary history of England, from the Norman Conquest in 1066 to the year 1803 (London: Thomas Hansard, 1808) 
 The Constitutional Year Book for 1913 (London: National Union of Conservative and Unionist Associations, 1913)
F W S Craig, British Parliamentary Election Results 1832-1885 (2nd edition, Aldershot: Parliamentary Research Services, 1989)
 
 T. H. B. Oldfield, The Representative History of Great Britain and Ireland (London: Baldwin, Cradock & Joy, 1816)
 Frederic A Youngs, jr, Guide to the Local Administrative Units of England, Vol II (London: Royal Historical Society, 1991)

Parliamentary constituencies in Worcestershire (historic)
Constituencies of the Parliament of the United Kingdom established in 1604
Constituencies of the Parliament of the United Kingdom established in 1295
Constituencies of the Parliament of the United Kingdom disestablished in 1950